Alan John Cain (7 December 1922 – 15 May 1998) was an Australian sailor. He competed in the Dragon event at the 1960 Summer Olympics.

References

External links
 
 
 

1922 births
1998 deaths
Australian male sailors (sport)
Olympic sailors of Australia
Sailors at the 1960 Summer Olympics – Dragon
Sportspeople from Melbourne
People from Footscray, Victoria
20th-century Australian people